Universitet Yugra, also called Universitet Yugra Surgut is a Russian professional basketball team. The team competes in the Russian Super League.

Honours
Russian Basketball Super League 1
Winners (2): 2003-04, 2016–17

Roster

Notable players

External links
Official Website
Eurobasket.com Team Info

Basketball teams in Russia
Sport in Khanty-Mansi Autonomous Okrug
Basketball teams in the Soviet Union